HMS Pylades was a  composite screw sloop of the Royal Navy, built at Sheerness Dockyard and launched on 5 November 1884. She was later reclassified as a corvette and was the last corvette built for the Royal Navy until the Second World War.

Service history
Initially on service with the North America and West Indies Station, she commenced service on the Australia Station in November 1894. 
From 30 May to 10 August 1896, she toured through the Solomon Islands with Charles Morris Woodford, who had been appointed the Resident Commissioner of the Solomon Islands, which was administered as part of British Western Pacific Territories.

Commander Robert Hornby was appointed in command in September 1901. Commander Herbert Charles da Costa was appointed in command from 3 January 1903. She left the Australia Station on 29 January 1905. She was sold to Cohen of Felixstowe for breaking on 3 April 1906.

Pylades is what is known as "composite" built. Soon after the building of ships with iron was commenced, this composite system of construction was adopted in the British merchant service, and some very fast and celebrated vessels were thus constructed. The iron framing, with wooden skin planking, admitted of considerable strength being obtained, and the possibility of sheathing the bottom with metal in order to avoid fouling, appeared to be another advantage in favor of the composite system. Soon, however, it was shown that the galvanic action set up between the copper on the "yellow metal" sheathing, and the iron frames tended to rapidly deteriorate the ironwork, and perhaps, sooner or later, hasten the loss of the vessel. So rapid, indeed, was this wasting of the frame found to be, that for some time past the composite system has been, so far as regards merchantmen, quite abandoned. Some ships, however, are still built "composite" for the Royal Navy, especially such craft as are intended for use on foreign stations, and whose duties would render frequent docking impossible. Such vessels are built with frames of steel, then sheathed with wood, and coppered.

Citations

References
Bastock, John (1988), Ships on the Australia Station, Child & Associates Publishing Pty Ltd; Frenchs Forest, Australia. 

 

1884 ships
Ships built in Sheerness
Satellite-class sloops
Victorian-era sloops of the United Kingdom